Biplab Chatterjee is an Indian actor and director of television and films.

Career
Biplab started his film career with Satyajit Ray in his film Pratidwandi. He is popular for his antagonistic character in Bengali films. Apart from his career in films, he has also shown interest in socio-political activities. In 1998, he was a candidate for assembly election from Rashbehari constituency and in 2006 from Alipore constituency.

Filmography

As actor
 Rajar Kirty (2020)
 Asur (2020) 
 Paran Bandhu Re (2019)
 Chaamp (2017) 
 Ei Toh Jeebon (2017) 
 Rokto (2016)
 Nirbhoya (2013)
 Mrs. Sen (2013)
Ullas (2012)
 Astra (2012)
 Teen Kanya (2012)
 Khokababu (2012) 
 Teen Yaari Katha (2012) 
 Gosainbaganer Bhoot (2011) 
 Tenida (film) (2011) 
 Shotru (2011) 
 Royal Bengal Rahasya (2011)
 Wanted (2010)
 Bangal Ghoti Phataphati (Unreleased) (2009)
 Magno Mainak (2009)
 Sedin Dujone (2008)
 Manik
 Ek Muto Chobi
 Tulkalam (2007) in Special Appearance
 Kailashe Kelenkari (2007)
 Jara Bristite Bhijechhilo (2007)
 Refugee (2006)
 Agnipath (2005)
 Parineeta (2005) as Shyam Lal Tantiya
 Rajmohol (2005)
 Paribar (2004)
 Swapne Dekha Rajkanya (2004)
 Patalghar (2003) as Vik
 Moner Majhe Tumi (2003)
 Dekha (2001) 
 Jibon Niye Khela (1999)
 Lal Darja (1997)
 Phiriye Dao (1994)
 Rakte Lekha (1992)
 East Bengaler Chele (1989)
 Bagh Bahadur (1989) (Hindi)
 Hirer Shikal (1988)
 Pratikar (1987)
 Phatik Chand (1983) as Shyamlal
 Surya Sakhi (1981)
 Bancharamer Bagan (1980) as Hontka and Kontka
 Ek Din Pratidin (1979) as Policeman
 Sabuj Dwiper Raja (1979)
 Joi Baba Felunath (1978)
 Charmurti (1978)
 Din Amader (1977)
 Khunjey Berai (1971)
 Pratidwandi (1970)

As director
 Chor O Bhagoban (2003)
 Tomar Aamar Prem (1998)
 Bidrohini (1994)
 Prajapati (1993)
 Abhimanyu (1990)

Awards
 BFJA for Best Supporting Actor for Debipaksha in 2005
 BFJA for Best Supporting Actor for Banaphul in 1997

References

External links
 
 

Bengali male actors
Living people
University of Calcutta alumni
Male actors from Kolkata
Film directors from Kolkata
20th-century Indian male actors
20th-century Indian film directors
21st-century Indian male actors
Male actors in Bengali cinema
Indian male film actors
Indian male television actors
1946 births